Mount Pulag is Luzon's highest peak at  above sea level, third-highest mountain in the Philippines, and the 26th-highest peak of an island on Earth. It is second-most prominent mountain in the Philippines, it is a dormant volcano. Located on the triple border of the provinces of Benguet, Ifugao, and Nueva Vizcaya, the borders meet at the mountain's peak. Mount Pulag is third highest next to Mount Apo and Mount Dulang-dulang.

 Mount Pulag is famous for its "sea of clouds" and its exceptional view of the Milky Way Galaxy at dawn, which has attracted many tourists who wish to see the "other-worldly" scenery. 

The entire mountain is believed to be the home to the tinmongao spirits and is the sacred resting ground of the souls of the Ibaloi people and other ethnic peoples in the area.

History
The Ibaloi people of Benguet mummify their dead and house them in caverns in the mountain. The Kabayan mummy burial caves, one of the main attraction of the site, are considered Philippine national cultural treasures under Presidential Decree No. 432.

It is part of the Cordillera Biogeographic Zone and is a National Integrated Protected Areas Programme (NIPAP) site.

The national park is inhabited by different ethnic groups such as the Ibalois, Kalanguya, Kankana-eys, Karao, and Ifugaos.

Geography

The peak of the mountain is located in the Municipality of Kabayan Province of Benguet.

Climate 
The climate at the summit of Mount Pulag is subpolar oceanic (Köppen Cwc), bordering a subtropical highland (Köppen Cwb) climate, as its summer mean temperatures only slightly exceed 10 degrees Celsius. Snow has not fallen on its top in at least the past 100 years, only hailstorms that look like snow. However, there have been mild flurries on the mountain, especially during December, January and February. Frost is more common on the mountain due to the low temperature during those months. During the winter season, the temperature at the highest point of the mountain is known to dip into sub-freezing temperatures, making it the coldest place in the country. The only recorded incidence of snow was in the late 1800s.

Fauna and flora 

Mount Pulag has a large diversity of flora and fauna, including many species that endemic to the mountain. Mount Pulag hosts 528 documented plant species. It is the natural habitat of the dwarf bamboo (Yushania niitakayamensis) and the Benguet pine (Pinus kesiya) that dominate the areas of Luzon tropical pine forests found on the mountainsides. The Philippine yew tree, which contains a compound associated with cancer treatment, is found on Mount Pulag. Its bark is used by indigenous Ibaloi and Kalanguya communities to make tea.

At lower elevations, Mount Pulag has a mossy forest full of ferns, lichens, and moss.

Among its native wildlife are 33 bird species and several threatened mammals such as the Philippine deer, giant bushy-tailed cloud rat (bowet) and the long-haired fruit bat. Mount Pulag is the only place that hosts the four cloud rat species. It is one of the most biodiverse locations in the Philippines, with the newly found (since 1896) 185-grams dwarf cloud rat, Carpomys melanurus, a rare breed (endemic to the Cordillera), and the Koch pitta bird among its endangered denizens.

Conservation efforts
In April 2022, President Rodrigo Duterte signed a law declaring Mount Pulag as a protected landscape under the National Integrated Protected Areas System.

Hiking activity

As the highest mountain in Luzon, Mount Pulag attracts a lot of mountain climbers. Highlights of the climb include the montane forests and the grassland summit with its "sea of clouds" phenomenon. There are four major trails up the summit: the Ambangeg, Akiki, and Tawangan trails from Benguet and the Ambaguio trail from Nueva Vizcaya. These trails are managed by the Mount Pulag National Park, under the Department of Environment and Natural Resources.

Incidents

Presidential helicopter crash
The aircraft pilots and their passengers, who were presidential appointees, died in the crash.

January 2018 forest fire
On January 20, 2018, the Mount Pulag National Park temporarily suspended trekking and hiking activities on Mount Pulag following a forest fire at a section of the mountain. According to an initial investigation, the fire started when a butane gas stove brought by a hiker allegedly exploded. The fire officers in site have declared a fire extinguished later that day. Suits were afterwards filed against the perpetrators of the fire. Park rangers estimated that it will take at least 6 months to 1 year before the area completely recovers.

See also
 List of mountains in the Philippines
 List of national parks of the Philippines
 List of Southeast Asian mountains

References

External links

 Mount Pulag National Park – BirdLife Data Zone

Pulag
Landforms of Benguet
Landforms of Ifugao
Landforms of Nueva Vizcaya
National parks of the Philippines
Protected areas established in 1987
Tourist attractions in Benguet
World Heritage Tentative List for the Philippines
Two-thousanders of Asia